Echinolittorina vidua is a species of sea snail, a marine gastropod mollusk in the family Littorinidae, the winkles or periwinkles.

Description

Distribution

References

 Reid D.G. (2007) The genus Echinolittorina Habe, 1956 (Gastropoda: Littorinidae) in the Indo-West Pacific Ocean. Zootaxa 1420: 1–161.

External links

Littorinidae
Gastropods described in 1859